Benjamin Bernstein may refer to:

 Ben Blue (Benjamin Bernstein, 1901–1975), Canadian-American actor and comedian
 Benjamin Abram Bernstein (1881–1964), American mathematician